Suares is one of three parishes (administrative divisions)  in Bimenes, a municipality within the province and autonomous community of Asturias, in northern Spain. 

Villages

References  

Parishes in Bimenes